Vilshofen an der Donau is a town  in the German district of Passau.

Demographics

Religion

The population of Vilshofen is predominantly Christian. In Vilshofen there is a Catholic Church, a Protestant Church and a new Apostolic Church. 63% identify as Catholic, 7% as Protestant and 30 % have no or other religious affiliation.

Politics

Results of the 2008 Mayoral Election were as follows:

Georg Krenn (CSU) 3973 (53.2%)

Joachim Boiger (SPD) 935 (12.5%)

Siegfried Piske (Überparteiliche Wählergemeinschaft) 1039 (13.9%)

Brigitte Pollok-Will (Freie Wählergemeinschaft) 954 (12.8%)

Johann Brandl (FDP) 564 (7.6%)

References

External links 

  

Passau (district)
Populated places on the Danube